Podarcis ionicus, the Crimean wall lizard, is a species of lizard in the family Lacertidae. It is endemic to Greece.

References

Podarcis
Reptiles described in 1902
Endemic fauna of Greece